The 2015 NASCAR Mexico Series was the ninth season of the NASCAR Mexico Series, and the twelfth organized by NASCAR Mexico. On January 13, 2015, the NASCAR México Series presented by FOX Sports 3 announced that its entitlement sponsorship with Toyota stopped in 2015 after three years. It began with the Toyota 120 at Phoenix International Raceway on March 13, and ended with the RedCo 240 at Autódromo Chiapas, on November 22. Abraham Calderón entered the season as the defending Drivers' Champion. Rubén García, Jr. won the championship, eighteen points in front of Rubén Rovelo.

Drivers

Schedule
The full schedule for the 2015 season was released on January 15, 2015.

Results and standings

Races

Notes
1 – The qualifying session for the Puebla 240 was cancelled due to heavy rain. The starting line-up was decided by championship points.
2 – The qualifying session for the HAAS CNC 200 was cancelled due to heavy rain. The starting line-up was decided by championship points.
3 – The qualifying session for the Coca-Cola Zero 240 was cancelled due to heavy rain. The starting line-up was decided by championship points.

Drivers' championship

(key) (Bold – Pole position awarded by qualifying time. Italics – Pole position earned by points standings or practice time. * – Most laps led.)

. – Eliminated after Coca-Cola Zero 240 (First Desafío-race)
. – Eliminated after Desafío Deportivo 240 (Second Desafío-race)
. – Eliminated after Red Cola 240 (Third Desafío-race)
. – Eliminated after Alcatel OneTouch 240 (Penultimate Desafío-race)

Notes
1 – Israel Jaitovich received championship points, despite the fact that he did not qualify for the race.

See also

2015 NASCAR Sprint Cup Series
2015 NASCAR Xfinity Series
2015 NASCAR Camping World Truck Series
2015 NASCAR K&N Pro Series East
2015 NASCAR K&N Pro Series West
2015 NASCAR Whelen Modified Tour
2015 NASCAR Whelen Southern Modified Tour
2015 NASCAR Canadian Tire Series
2015 NASCAR Whelen Euro Series

References

NASCAR Mexico Series

NASCAR Mexico Series